Pianist, Arranger, Composer, Conductor is the second solo album by American musician Richard Carpenter, released in 1998. It includes instrumental versions of popular songs of the Carpenters, and is dedicated to their deceased mother, Agnes Carpenter. The album contains two new songs, "All Those Years Ago" and "Karen's Theme", which was released as a single.

Track listing
"Prelude" (Richard Carpenter) – 0:57
"Yesterday Once More" (John Bettis, Richard Carpenter) – 3:41
Medley – 12:12
"Sing" (Joe Raposo)
"Goodbye to Love" (John Bettis, Richard Carpenter)
"Eve" (John Bettis, Richard Carpenter)
"Rainy Days and Mondays" (Roger Nichols, Paul Williams)
"Look to Your Dreams" (John Bettis, Richard Carpenter, Frank Esler-Smith)
"Superstar" (Bonnie Bramlett, Leon Russell)
"Someday" (John Bettis, Richard Carpenter, Leonard Bernstein, Stephen Sondheim)
"I Need to Be in Love" (John Bettis, Richard Carpenter, Albert Hammond) – 3:09
"Sandy" (John Bettis, Richard Carpenter) – 3:50
"Time" (Richard Carpenter, Dave Clark) – 3:34
"For All We Know" (Arthur James, Fred Karlin, Robb Wilson) – 3:37
"One Love" (John Bettis, Richard Carpenter) – 4:58
"Bless the Beasts and Children" (Perry Botkin, Jr., Barry De Vorzon) – 3:29
"Flat Baroque" (Richard Carpenter) – 1:51
"All Those Years Ago" (Richard Carpenter, Pamela Phillips Oland, Tim Rice) – 2:24
"Top of the World" (John Bettis, Richard Carpenter) – 3:21
"We've Only Just Begun" (Roger Nichols, Paul Williams) – 2:26
"Karen's Theme" (Richard Carpenter) – 2:40

Singles
"Karen's Theme" (1997)

Personnel
Adapted from AllMusic:
 Karen Carpenter - drums, vocals
 Earl Dumler - English horn, oboe
 Jim Gordon - drums
 Norm Herzberg - bassoon
 James Kanter - clarinet
 Paul Leim - drums
 Harvey Mason - drums
 Timothy May - banjo, guitar
 Tommy Morgan - harmonica
 O.K. Chorale - vocals
 Joe Osborn - bass
 Tony Peluso - guitar
 John Phillips - tenor saxophone
 Sheridon Stokes - flute, recorder

References 

1997 albums
A&M Records albums
Richard Carpenter (musician) albums